Davis Industries was a firearms manufacturer established in 1982 by Jim Davis. Davis produced a series of inexpensive handguns, which were sold primarily through pawn shops and marketed towards people with low income. The guns were constructed of injection-molded Zamak, a zinc alloy.

Jim Davis had previously been the office manager at Raven Arms, established by George Jennings, and was also Jennings' son-in-law. As one of the companies connected to Raven Arms, and a maker of Saturday night specials, Davis was described by the U.S. Bureau of Alcohol, Tobacco, Firearms and Explosives as one of the "Ring of Fire" companies, a series of companies established around Los Angeles, California, all of which manufactured inexpensive handguns of similar design and all of which were connected to Raven Arms.

Davis primarily manufactured and sold pocket pistols and derringers, in .22 Long Rifle, .32 ACP, and .380 ACP. However, they also marketed some larger handguns in 9mm Parabellum and .45 ACP.

In 1999, Davis filed for bankruptcy and went out of business as a result of a large number of lawsuits being filed by cities and municipalities.

See also 
Arcadia Machine & Tool
Jimenez Arms
Lorcin Engineering Company
Phoenix Arms
Raven Arms
Sundance Industries

References 

Defunct firearms manufacturers
Firearm manufacturers of the United States
American companies established in 1982
American companies disestablished in 1999
1982 establishments in California
Derringers
1999 disestablishments in California
Defunct manufacturing companies based in California